Ann Grete Nørgaard Østerballe (born 15 September 1983) is a Danish professional handballer. She is retired from Denmark national team.

International honours 
EHF Champions League:
Winner: 2006
Finalist: 2001 
EHF Cup:
Winner: 2004, 2013
Finalist: 2011
World Championship:
Bronze Medalist: 2013
Norwegian League
 Silver: 2020/2021

Individual awards 
 All-Star Left Wing of the Danish Handball League: 2008, 2011, 2013, 2015, 2017

Personal life
She is an educated teacher from VIA University College in Skive as of 2010, being specialised in the subjects Mathematics, Social Studies, History and Science.

References

1983 births
Living people
Danish female handball players
Viborg HK players
SCM Râmnicu Vâlcea (handball) players
Handball players at the 2012 Summer Olympics
Olympic handball players of Denmark
Expatriate handball players 
Danish expatriate sportspeople in Romania